Bobs may refer to:

People
 Bobs Gannaway (born 1965), director with Disney Television Animation; see Mickey Mouse Works
 Bobs Cogill Haworth (1900–1988), South African-born Canadian painter and potter
 Frederick Roberts, 1st Earl Roberts (1832–1914), British field marshal
 Bobs Watson (1930–1999), American actor and Methodist minister

Other
 Bobs Worth, an Irish racehorse

See also
 Bob's (disambiguation)
 The Bobs (disambiguation)
 Bobs Creek (disambiguation)
 Bobs Lake (disambiguation)
 Bob (disambiguation)